Dinah Silveira Ribeiro (also known as Diná Silveira de Queirós; November 9, 1911 – November 27, 1982), was a Brazilian writer of novels, short stories, and chronicles. She received the Machado de Assis Prize.

Silveira de Queirós was born November 9, 1911 in São Paulo.
She published her main works between 1939 and 1955. Silveira de Queirós was a Machado de Assis Prize laureate and the "second woman to be elected to the Brazilian Academy of Letters". She died November 27, 1982 in Rio de Janeiro. Her novel A Muralha was the basis for the 1968 telenovela A Muralha and for the 2000 television series A Muralha.

Selected works 
1939 - Floradas na Serra, novel
1941 - A Sereia Verde, short stories
1949 - Margarida La Rocque, novel
1951 - As Aventuras do Homem Vegetal, children's fiction
1954 - A Muralha, novel
1956 - O Oitavo Dia, play
1957 - As Noite do Morro do Encanto, short stories
1960 - Era Uma Vez Uma Princesa, biography
1960 - Eles Herdarão a Terra, short stories
1965 - Os Invasores, novel
1966 - A Princesa dos Escravos, biography
1968 - Verão dos Infiéis, novel
1969 - Comba Malina, short stories
1969 - Café da Manhã, chronicle
1974 - Eu Venho, Memorial do Cristo I
1977 - Eu, Jesus, Memorial do Cristo II
1979 - Baía de Espuma, children's fiction
1981 - Guida, Caríssima Guida, novel

Co-authored works 
1960 - Antologia Brasileira de Ficção-científica, short stories
1961 - Histórias do Acontecerá, short stories
1962 - O Mistério dos MMM, novel
1962 - Quadrante 1, chronicle
1963 - Quadrante 2, chronicle

References

External links
 Diná Silveira de Queirós at Academia Brasileira de Letras

1911 births
1982 deaths
Brazilian women novelists
Brazilian women short story writers
Chroniclers
Brazilian children's writers
Brazilian women children's writers
Women biographers
Writers from São Paulo
20th-century Brazilian novelists
20th-century Brazilian women writers
20th-century biographers
20th-century Brazilian short story writers